Jason F. McLennan (born 1973) is an architect and prominent figure in the green building movement. He is the founder, former chair, and current board member of the International Living Future Institute and Cascadia Green Building Council, a chapter of both the United States Green Building Council and the Canada Green Building Council. He is the CEO of McLennan Design, his own architecture and planning firm that does work all over the world. McLennan is also the creator of Pharos, an advanced building material rating system, Declare, an ingredient disclosure label for building products, and JUST, a social justice transparency platform for organizations.  In addition, he developed the Living Community Challenge and Living Product Challenge.  Additionally, McLennan formerly served as the chief innovation officer for Integral Group.

The Living Building Challenge 

McLennan created the Living Building Challenge, a sustainable design performance standard, while he was a principal with BNIM Architects. He transferred the intellectual property for the Challenge to Cascadia Green Building Council when he became that organization's CEO in 2006, and formally launched the program in November of that year.

Awards and honors

In 2013, McLennan was recognized by GreenBiz.com with the VERGE 25 Worldchanger Award. In 2012, McLennan's Living Building Challenge was the recipient of the 2012 Buckminster Fuller Challenge Award.  McLennan was named an Ashoka Fellow in 2012 for "creating incentives and new practices so that the built environment improves health, well-being while increasing our access to a diverse and productive natural world."  In 2012, he was also appointed to join Deepak Chopra, Dick Gephardt, Mel Matinez and Terry McAuliffe on the advisory board of Delos, a wellness real estate development firm founded by Paul Scialla. He is a member of the Clinton Global Initiative, and in 2011, he was named one of Yes! Magazine's  Breakthrough 15.
McLennan is a frequent speaker at green building and sustainability conferences and has presented at events including: Bioneers, Greenbuild and the Australian Green Building Conference.

In April 2016, McLennan received the Award of Excellence from Engineering News-Record magazine. McLennan's residence, Heron Hall, was named “home of the month worldwide" by Architectural Record in 2017.

Books 

McLennan is the author of seven books: Transformational Thought II (2016), Transformational Thought (2012),  Zugunruhe: The Inner Migration To Profound Environmental Change (2010), The Ecological Engineer (2006), The Dumb Architect's Guide to Glazing Selection (2004), The Philosophy of Sustainable Design (2004), and LOVE+GREEN BUILDING: You and Me and the Beautiful Planet.

Family 

Jason F. McLennan is married to Tracy McLennan and has four children, Julian, Declan, Aidan and Rowan.

References 

1973 births
Living people
Canadian architects
People from Greater Sudbury
Ashoka Fellows
Ashoka USA Fellows